Mirsarai Economic Zone is an industrial economic zone currently under development in Mirsarai Upazila, Chittagong on the bank of Sandwip channel. It is being developed on an area of 30,000 acres and is governed by Bangladesh Economic Zones Authority (BEZA) under the Bangladesh Economic Zone Act, 2010.

References 

Special economic zones of Bangladesh
Chittagong District
Foreign trade of Bangladesh